Marcel Jean Versteeg (born 20 August 1965) is a retired Dutch long-distance runner. He competed at the 1992 Summer Olympics in the 5000 m and finished in 15th place. He won four national titles in this event, in 1990, 1991, 1994 and 1998, as well as one title in 10,000 m in 2001.

References

External links
IAAF profile

1965 births
Living people
Athletes (track and field) at the 1992 Summer Olympics
Dutch male long-distance runners
Olympic athletes of the Netherlands
Sportspeople from Arnhem